GURL is a 2020 New Zealand short film directed, written and produced by Mika X. The film premiered at the New Zealand International Film Festival as part of the "Ngā Whanaunga Māori Pasifika Shorts 2020" selection curated by Leo Koziol and Craig Fasi. GURL tells a story of Carmen Rupe experience in the context of being both Maori and LGBT: "The infamous Māori Drag Queen Carmen 'Gurl' finally accepts her-true-self when she falls in love with a fading rugby star on an ill-fated night in New Zealand 1975." This short film is a prequel to the feature film "The Book of Carmen" which has been in pre-production since the release of GURL.

Plot
GURL is about night of the life of Carmen Rupe. While she is working the streets in the evening of K road, Carmen lives in a fantasy as a younger transgender woman "Gurl", working as a sex worker, waiting for her White Knight to take her away. When the white knight isn't what he makes out to be, Gurl escapes a violent. While she collects herself, an unexpected person comes to her aid, A dying All Black. The two spend an evening together as they fall in love.

Cast 
Jay Tewake as Gurl / Young Carmen
Jackie Clarke as Sapphire
Brady Peeti as Gypsy
Regan Taylor as Ed
Aaron Ward as White Knight
Mika X as Carmen
Rosanna Raymond as Mystik Maiden
Ramon Te Wake as Mystik Ra
Amanaki Prescott as Mystik Ama
Amanduh La Hoare as Lofty Queen
Danielle Hayes as Terracotta Blade
Whetu Fala as Whaea
Richie Cattell as Rugby Lad

Credits

Director
Directed and Written by: Mika X

Producers
Executive Producer: Mika X
Consulting Producer: Georgina Allison Conder
Consulting Producer: Philippa Campbell
Line Producer: Lance Loughlin
Associate Producer: Alex Plumb

Music department
Music Composers: Mark Dennison	
Music Composers: Penny Dodd
Music Producer and Mastered by: Alan Jansson
Music Manager: Benjamin Thomas Watt

Design
Production Design: Shaun Dooley

Sound Department
Sound Recordists: Tipene Rogers
Sound Recordists: Mark Storie

Editing
Editor: Anastasia Doniants
Editing Studio: Department of post

Releases
The film premiered at the New Zealand International Film Festival at ASB Waterfront Theatre on 26 July 2020. The film was also be available to watch online until 2 August. The film was screened in the first weekend of August at Rialto Cinema Tauranga, Monterey Howick Cinemas in Auckland, Regent cinema in Dunedin, Len Lye Centre in New Plymouth and Roxy Cinema in Wellington.

Soundtrack

Single

Track listing
Digital download
"What Kind Of Coffee Do You Like?" – 2:26

Album

Reception

Critical response 
Since the release of GURL in 2020, the film has maintained a review rating of 9.5 stars on IMDB in 2022.

Accolades

References

External links 
 Official website
 
 New Zealand International Film Festival Website

2020 films
2020 LGBT-related films
2020 short films
New Zealand LGBT-related films
New Zealand short films
Transgender-related films
Films about Māori people
2020s English-language films